Sånger för december was released on 22 November 2006, and is a Christmas album by Uno Svenningsson and Irma Schultz Keller, with guests. The Christmas songs were newly-written and newly-translated original songs, but no traditional Christmas songs in Sweden.

Track listing
Names within brackets refer to performer.

Sånger för december - Intro
När julen rullar över världen    (Uno Svenningsson)
Jag tror det blir snö i natt    (Irma Schultz)
Ängel    (Uno Svenningsson & Irma Schultz)
Första snön är alltid vitast    (Uno Svenningsson)
Så underbart!    (Uno Svenningsson)
Ett hus är inget hem    (Uno Svenningsson & Irma Schultz)
Vår stad    (Kristoffer Jonzon & Irma Schultz)
Årets sista dag    (Uno Svenningsson & Irma Schultz)
Tungan emot stolpen    (Wille Crafoord)
Ett fotografi    (Uno Svenningsson)
TV-mannen    (Uno Svenningsson)
På nakna fötter    (Irma Schultz)
Sånger för december / En frälsare är född - Outro  (Bob Hansson)

Charts

References

2006 Christmas albums
Irma Schultz Keller albums
Christmas albums by Swedish artists
Pop Christmas albums
Uno Svenningsson albums